The Singles is The Pretenders' 1987 compilation album and features all the band's UK single hits to that date, as well as including "I Got You Babe" which Chrissie Hynde had performed with UB40 in 1985. The album reached #69 in the US album chart and #6 in the UK.

Track listing

Charts

Certifications and sales

References

1987 compilation albums
The Pretenders compilation albums
Albums produced by Bob Clearmountain
Albums produced by Chris Thomas (record producer)
Albums produced by Nick Lowe
Sire Records compilation albums